John Lawrence Savage (February 23, 1936 – October 20, 2018) was a Canadian politician. He served in the Legislative Assembly of British Columbia from 1987 to 1991, as a Social Credit member for the constituency of Delta.

References

British Columbia Social Credit Party MLAs
1936 births
2018 deaths
Members of the Executive Council of British Columbia
People from the Regional District of Nanaimo